The men's triple jump at the 1952 Olympic Games took place on 23 July at the Helsinki Olympic Stadium. Thirty-five athletes from 23 nations competed. The maximum number of athletes per nation had been set at 3 since the 1930 Olympic Congress. Brazilian athlete Adhemar da Silva won the gold medal, breaking the world record twice. It was Brazil's first medal and first victory in the men's long jump. All three of the nations represented on the podium were relatively new to the event in the Olympics; Brazil had sent triple jumpers in 1948 (including da Silva), but the Soviet Union (Leonid Shcherbakov's silver) and Venezuela (Asnoldo Devonish's bronze) each won medals in their first appearance.

Background

This was the 12th appearance of the event, which is one of 12 athletics events to have been held at every Summer Olympics. Returning finalists from the 1948 Games were gold medalist Arne Åhman of Sweden, fourth-place finisher Preben Larsen of Denmark, fifth-place finisher Geraldo de Oliveira of Brazil, sixth-place finisher Valle Rautio of Finland, and eighth-place finisher Adhemar da Silva of Brazil. The last of these, da Silva, had been very successful in the intervening four years; he tied the world record in 1950 and broke it in 1951, as well as winning the Pan American championship. He was "co-favorite" with European champion Leonid Shcherbakov of the Soviet Union.

Belgium, Egypt, Ghana, Puerto Rico, Saar, the Soviet Union, and Venezuela each made their first appearance in the event. The United States competed for the 12th time, having competed at each of the Games so far.

Competition format

The competition used the two-round format introduced in 1936. In the qualifying round, each jumper received three attempts to reach the qualifying distance of 14.55 metres; if fewer than 12 men did so, the top 12 (including all those tied) would advance. In the final round, each athlete had three jumps; the top six received an additional three jumps, with the best of the six to count.

Records

Prior to this competition, the existing world and Olympic records were as follows.

Adhemar da Silva jumped further than his own world record four times: 16.12 in the second jump in the final round, 16.09 in the fourth, 16.22 in the fifth, and 16.05 in the sixth.

Schedule

All times are Eastern European Summer Time (UTC+3)

Results

Qualifying

Those achieving the qualifying performance of 14.55 metres advanced to the final.

Final

Devonish was injured and did not jump after the second round.

References

External links
Official Olympic Report, la84.org.
International Association of Athletics Federations: Brazil's Two-Time Olympic Champion Adhemar Ferreira da Silva Passes Away

Athletics at the 1952 Summer Olympics
Triple jump at the Olympics
Men's events at the 1952 Summer Olympics